David Bruce Tetteh (born 10 August 1985) is a Ghanaian-born former Kyrgyz international footballer who is currently a coach for Dordoi Bishkek.

Career

Club
Born in Ghana, he moved to Central Asia in 2006, playing one season in Tajikistan for Regar-TadAZ Tursunzoda. He moved to neighbouring Kyrgyzstan in 2007, on loan to local giants Dordoi, for whom he signed the following season. In 2008 Tetteh obtained Kyrgyz citizenship, which made him available for the national team five years later. By the end of the 2013 season, Tetteh reached the milestone of scoring at least 100 goals in Kyrgyzstan League and Cup matches.

After nine years with Dordoi Bishkek, Tetteh moved to Bahraini Second Division side Al-Ittihad on 30 September 2016.
In September 2017, Tetteh joined Turkish Regional Amateur League side Tatvan Gençlerbirliği.

In October 2018, Tetteh joined Sheikh Jamal Dhanmondi.

International
Tetteh came to fame in Kyrgyzstan immediately after he made his international debut at the 2014 AFC Challenge Cup qualification tournament.  He scored all of Kyrgyzstan's goals in three consecutive 1–0 victories.

Kyrgyzstan manager Sergey Dvoryankov praised Tetteh, and after one of the matches of the campaign thanked "everyone who gave him Kyrgyz citizenship".

Coaching
On 3 April 2021, Dordoi Bishkek announced the return of Tetteh as a coach for their second team.

On 8 January 2022, Tetteh was promoted to coach of Dordoi Bishkek.

Career statistics

Club

International

Statistics accurate as of match played 17 November 2015

International goals
Scores and results list Kyrgyzstan's goal tally first.

Honors

Club
Regar-TadAZ
Tajik League: 2006
Tajik Cup: 2006

Dordoi Bishkek
Kyrgyzstan League: 2007, 2008, 2009, 2011, 2012, 2014
Kyrgyzstan Cup: 2008, 2010, 2012, 2014
Kyrgyzstan Super Cup: 2011, 2012, 2013, 2014

References

External links

TFF Profile

1985 births
Living people
Ghanaian emigrants to Kyrgyzstan
Ghanaian footballers
Kyrgyzstani footballers
Kyrgyzstan international footballers
Association football midfielders
Kyrgyzstani expatriate footballers
Expatriate footballers in Tajikistan
Expatriate footballers in Kyrgyzstan
Place of birth missing (living people)
Tajikistan Higher League players
Kyrgyz Premier League players
FC Dordoi Bishkek players